Gotthardt Wolf (1887–1947) was a German cinematographer who worked on nearly fifty films, mostly during the silent era. He worked on a number of films with Harry Piel the star of comedy-thrillers such as His Greatest Bluff (1927).

Selected filmography
 Miss Piccolo (1914)
 Judith Trachtenberg (1920)
 The Lord of the Beasts (1920)
 The House on the Moon (1921)
 The Flight into Death (1921)
 City in View (1923)
 Dangerous Clues (1924)
 The Man Without Nerves (1924)
 A Dangerous Game (1924)
 The Fake Emir (1924)
 Adventure on the Night Express (1925)
 Zigano (1925)
 Swifter Than Death (1925)
 Eyes Open, Harry! (1926)
The Black Pierrot (1926)
 Night of Mystery (1927)
 His Greatest Bluff (1927)
 His Strongest Weapon (1928)
 Man Against Man (1928)
 Panic (1928)
 Men Without Work (1929)
 The Hero of Every Girl's Dream (1929)
 The Merry Widower (1929)
 His Best Friend (1929)
 The Big Attraction (1931)
 A Daughter of Her People (1933)

References

Bibliography
 Bach, Steven. Marlene Dietrich: Life and Legend. University of Minnesota Press, 2011.
 Bock, Hans-Michael & Bergfelder, Tim. The Concise CineGraph. Encyclopedia of German Cinema. Berghahn Books, 2009.

External links

1887 births
1947 deaths
German cinematographers
People from Mittelsachsen
Film people from Saxony